Alexandrinia is an extinct genus of mayflies which existed in what is now Russia and the United States during the Permian period. It was described by N. D. Sinitshenkova and D. V. Vassilenko in 2012, and contains four species: A. gigantea, A. directa, A. ipsa and A. vitta.

References

Mayfly genera
Prehistoric insect genera
Permian insects
Prehistoric insects of North America